The 2000 Louisiana Tech Bulldogs football team represented Louisiana Tech University as an independent during the 2000 NCAA Division I-A football season. Led by second-year head coach Jack Bicknell Jr., the Bulldogs played their home games at Joe Aillet Stadium in Ruston, Louisiana. The team finished the season with a record of 3–9.

Schedule

References

Louisiana Tech
Louisiana Tech Bulldogs football seasons
Louisiana Tech Bulldogs football